Sarah Grey (born May 19, 1996) is a Canadian actress. She is known for her portrayal of Alyssa, the female lead on the Netflix horror-drama series The Order.

Life and career 
Grey was born in British Columbia, Canada.

Grey has appeared on shows such as Almost Human, and Bates Motel playing young Norma Bates. Her first film role came in 2013, when she landed the part of Jennifer Beals' daughter Julia in the film Cinemanovels, which was a 2013 Official Selection for the Toronto International Film Festival. Grey has appeared in several television films. In August 2016, Grey was announced as portraying Courtney Whitmore/Stargirl in the second season of The CW television series Legends of Tomorrow. In April 2018, Grey was cast in the Netflix horror-drama series The Order, playing the female lead Alyssa Drake.

Filmography

Film

Television

References

External links 

1996 births
Living people
Actresses from British Columbia
Canadian child actresses
Canadian film actresses
Canadian television actresses